Elton Tsang Ka-wai (born 1980) is a Chinese Canadian poker player currently residing in Hong Kong. Considered as one of the five best Asian poker players, Tsang has achieved icon status in the international poker scene with his involvement in several historic achievements including:
 his role in founding and organising the first ever live poker tournament in Macau, China,
 his winning the 3rd highest prize in poker tournament history (€11,111,111),
 his part in the biggest pot in TV poker history (€2,090,000).

Outside of poker, Tsang is an investor and entrepreneur.

Poker

Early Years 
Born and raised in Vancouver, and with a bachelor's degree from University of British Columbia, Canada, Tsang first started playing poker online on party-poker in 2001 in $2/$4 Limit Hold'em games. It was upon returning to Hong Kong after graduating university that he realized poker was still very much non-existent in the neighboring city-state of Macau, where gambling was legal. With the vision that poker would be instantly popular in Macau, Tsang had the idea of hosting the first ever live poker tournament in Macau. After some research, he discovered that his relative was the owner of the Grand Waldo Casino in Macau. Tsang scheduled a meeting, gave a successful pitch, and went on to become the tournament's founding organizer in partnership with famed tournament director Matt Savage and Poker Stars as sponsors. This is how the APPT Macau (Asia Pacific Poker Tour) was started. But having signed just a one-year deal with Poker Stars and the casino, Tsang was left out the second year and the tournament continued to become what it is today. This was Tsang's first entrepreneurial move having invested about a million HKD (US$130K) of his own saving.

Tsang continued to play small stakes online, and had a short but successful run in the live tournament circuit before focusing mainly on cash games and playing full time. Starting off at the HKD$25/$50 ($3/$6) games in Hong Kong, Tsang begun to build his bankroll and moved up to higher stakes. Tsang later moved to Macau hoping to capitalise on the growing popularity of live cash games, and the influx of wealthy Asian businessmen whom were new to the game. His games started at HKD$50/$100, then moved to HKD$100/$200 where he struggled the most to maintain. At that time his goal was to play in the HK$1000/$2000 private game. He spent the next a couple years moving up and down the stakes while improving his skill. One of his defining moments in poker came during this time when he was able to finally out-play his then-nemesis, a US pro called Vietnamese John (John Hoang), in a tournament where Tsang came first after beating Vietnamese John heads-up. This was an important win and a significant boost to Tsang's confidence having been crushed and sent back down to lower stakes by Vietnamese John many times before.

The Big Game 
Between 2010 and 2012, Tsang continued to live in Macau, playing poker constantly, and living the fun and exciting life of a professional poker player. He made a lot of great poker friends there and he attributes them for helping him improve his game. Tsang was now playing at HK$300/$600 stakes steadily and some HK$1000/$2000 games. When Macau introduced Omaha, Tsang was ready having learned it online previously. He played in the HK$1000/$2000 Omaha games where he grew his bankroll considerably. Armed with a healthy bankroll, Tsang moved up the stakes onto HKD$10,000/$20,000 (USD$1.2K5/$2.5K) & HKD$20,000/$40,000 (USD$2.5K/$5K) No Limit Hold'em games where all the big pros played".I t was a juicy game", as Tsang calls it. Tsang was now playing in The Big Game alongside the world's biggest names in professional poker which included Gus Hansen, Phil Ivey, Patrik Antonius, John Juanda, Tom Dwan, and Johnny Chan. Tsang struggled to maintain at this game at first, having to drop down the stakes to play Pot Limit Omaha which he frequently used to build his bankroll back up. Eventually Tsang was able to overcome his loss, survive, and kept going up steadily after that. Tsang went on to become a regular in the world of super high stakes poker cash games, winning and losing pots in excess of ten million Hong Kong dollars (US$1.3M). Tsang shares the story of his most memorable game: “One of the games where I still remember until now. It was a game that would have broke me or made me. I was in Macau playing three-handed with Tom Dwan and the Chairman. That game, we were playing HKD Ten Million dollar buy-in (USD$1.2m) HK$50,000/HK$100,000 (USD$6/$12k) No- Limit. After playing 24-hours, I had lost HKD$60 million (USD$7.6m). That was my stop-limit. I was ready to quit. But then I ended up giving it one more bullet. I bought in for another HKD$20m (USD$2.5m) and had I lost it I would have had to move down in stakes and start all over. I was fortunate enough to win all my money back, and HKD$60m on top of that. It was the most important game of my life. I think that was in about 2014 or 2015.”

Big One for One Drop 2016 
In October 2016, Tsang was invited by Guy Laliberté, the founder of Cirque du Soleil, to participate in the €1,000,000 Monte-Carlo One Drop Extravaganza, an exclusive poker tournament. He defeated 25 other players to win the tournament and received a €11,111,111 ($12,248,912) payout for first, the third largest single payout in poker history. Tsang was coached by professional poker player, Mustapha Kanit.

Tsang's entry and eventually win in the Big One for One Drop tournament came at the right time. By then he had already established himself in the private world of super high stakes cash games, but still remained largely unknown to the general public. He was very comfortable financially but was finding himself being banned more and more from private games due to his success in those games. “The One Drop was good timing. All the time before that I wanted to stay low profile. Before that tournament happened, people in the poker world already know me. It doesn’t matter anymore. I am already getting the feeling people didn’t want me to play anyway. So it was good timing to win it. When I first started playing poker I wanted to win a bracelet, I wanted the first place; I wanted to be the champion. All the big players already knew about me, and how good I am, so I can’t hide that anymore", Tsang says. “It’s good because it’s a weird mix. The One Drop event made me recognised by the public, and most importantly my family. They can brag about this to their friends. This event made my family realise the accomplishment I have made. When I tell them about playing cash games, they don’t know what’s going on. Being on the news is different. It was in the newspapers in Hong Kong, so I was happy that my family got to recognise ten years of hard work.”

The Scandal 
In the same year, an anonymous story emerged alleging that while playing in a private game hosted at Casino Barcelona, Leon Tsoukernik had lost over €3,000,000 to Tsang, but Tsoukernik paid only €1,200,000, refusing to pay the remaining €2,000,000. When Tsang requested that the debt be paid in full, Tsoukernik claimed the game was "strange", elaborating that "...some people take advantage of knowing me and target me when I play poker cash games. I have thus experienced a variety of practices in the game, which corrupt the sport of the game. For example, poker collusion, marked cards, and hired professionals. I have many stories to tell, but I prefer to fight it my own way with the support of the courts of justice and other poker entrepreneurs instead of fighting rumours and lies over the internet."

Tsang confirmed the story in a 2017 interview, further clarifying that the amount he was owed were much higher. He stated he had won €1,190,000 from Tsoukernik in the first 3 sessions, plus another €3,375,000 in the last session, of which Tsoukernik had paid €1,200,000, so he was still owed €3,365,000.

Tsang's accusation against Tsoukernik echoes a similar case where Australian poker pro Matt Kirk sued Tsoukernik for refusing to repay a US$2,000,000 debt. In support of Tsang, several prominent poker players came to his defence, including Tong G, Winfred Yu, Philipp Gruissem, and Daniel Negreanu, who posted on Twitter saying "Elton is an honorable guy and is not lying."

Tournament results

Charity 

Tsang is involved in charity. He has donated to Mother's Choice, the Po Leung Kuk orphanage, and the Lord Grace Home for the Aged. He credits Sheen Hok Charitable Foundation founder, Alice Chiu, as being an inspiration saying "my passion for charitable work originates from Alice Chiu ... I was deeply touched by her efforts to help the needy in the society.  Earlier, I visited children with amblyopia in Handan, China. The experience taught me to be grateful for all I have, and do my best to help those in need."

References

External links
 
 Elton Tsang Hendon Mob profile

1980 births
Chinese poker players
Living people